Le Centre Technique National Henri Guérin (Henri Guérin National Technical Centre), commonly referred to as PEF Ploufragan, is the regional association football centre and is one of the nine élite academies of France; only the best players from the Brittany région train there. There are eight other élite youth academies in Metropolitan France (Castelmaurou, Châteauroux, Clairefontaine, Liévin, Dijon, Marseille, Vichy and Reims) covering the whole territory.

History
Located in Ploufragan, Brittany, the facility, known nationally as Pôle Espoirs Football de Ploufragan, began operation in 1995 as a result of an initiative created by former France national football team manager Henri Guérin, whom the centre is named after, and Paul Le Hesran. It trains players between the ages of 13–15. However, like its other regional counterparts, it is only a stepping stone for a few of the most promising players, while a second-tier center for the rest, compared to the national center Clairefontaine and its high reputation of producing the most gifted French players. The center did have the honor of training current national team member and former Ligue 1 Player of the Year Yoann Gourcuff.

Youth development
PEF Ploufragan incorporates the same training methods as Clairefontaine:
 Making the player’s movements faster and better
 Linking movements efficiently and wisely
 Using the weaker foot
 Weaknesses in the player’s game
 Psychological factors (sports personality tests)
 Medical factors
 Physical tests (beep test)
 Technical skills
 Skill training (juggling the ball, running with the ball, dribbling, kicking, passing and ball control)
 Tactical (to help the ball carrier, to get the ball back, to offer support, to pass the ball and follow the pass, positioning and the movement into space)

The center also provides students with a normal education curriculum, allows them to spend weekends and holidays with their families, and gives them the opportunity to continue training at their local club.

Notable former players
 Romain Danzé
 Yoann Gourcuff
 Pierre-Yves Hamel
 Sylvain Marveaux
 Virgile Reset
 Frédéric Sammaritano
 William Stanger

References

External links
 PEF Ploufragan Home Page

Football academies in France
Football venues in France
Sports venues in Côtes-d'Armor
Sports venues completed in 1995
Association football training grounds in France